Gus-Zhelezny (lit. iron goose) is an urban locality (an urban-type settlement) in Kasimovsky District of Ryazan Oblast, Russia. Population: 

It was founded in the 18th century on the Gus River's bank.

The main point of interest of Gus-Zhelezny is the 19th century Russian orthodox Trinity Cathedral, built in a rare for Russia Gothic Revival style with elements of neobaroque and neoclassicism.

References

External links
Proselki.ru. Information about Gus-Zhelezny 
History of Gus-Zhelezny 

Urban-type settlements in Ryazan Oblast
Melenkovsky Uyezd
Populated places established in the 18th century